Umid Iskandarov (sometimes spelled Umidjon Iskanderov in English) ((born September 24, 1980) — Uzbek actor and film director.

Umid Iskandarov  started his professional career as an actor in 2005. Iskandarov made his first movie with "Tuzoq" in 2008 and has starred in many movies since then.

Life 
Umid Iskandarov was born on September 24, 1980, in Tashkent in a creative family. In 2009 he studied at the Tashkent State Institute of Arts named after Mannon Uyghur. He was a student at the Faculty of Television and Radio Directing. Today, he continues his creative career as an actor. He has been appearing in commercials, music videos and shows since 2005. In 2011 he received the award "Best Young Actor of the Year" in Uzbekistan. Umid Iskandarov became widely known in Uzbekistan in 2010 after starring in the Uzbek drama  "O’yin ichida o’yin".

Family 
 Father: Qurbonali Maqsudxonzoda Iskandariy was born 1952 in Tashkent.
 Mother:  Sanoatxon  Iskandarova was born 1957 in Tashkent.
 Brother: Muhammad Ali Iskandarov Qurbonalievich was born 1983 in Tashkent.
 Brother: Anvar Iskandarov Qurbonalievich was born 1985 in Tashkent.
 Wife: The actor married Renata Iskandarova in 2009. But they divorced in 2015.

Filmography

Film 
Below is a chronologically ordered list of films in which Umid Iskandarov has appeared.

Miniseries

Music videos

References

External links 
 
Umid Iskandarov Instagram
Umid Iskandarov  Facebook

1980 births
Living people
Uzbeks
Uzbekistani male film actors
21st-century Uzbekistani male actors